The 1935 Tulsa Golden Hurricane football team represented the University of Tulsa during the 1935 college football season. In their eleventh and final year under head coach Gus Henderson, the Golden Hurricane compiled a 3–6–1 record, but was 3–0 in conference play and tied for the Missouri Valley Conference championship. The team defeated Oklahoma A&M (12–0), Washburn (19–6), and Drake (7–0), tied Kansas State (13–13), and lost to SMU (14), TCU (14–12), Centenary (22–0), George Washington (3–0), and Arkansas (14–7).

Schedule

1936 NFL Draft

The following Golden Hurricane was selected in the 1936 NFL draft.

References

Tulsa
Tulsa Golden Hurricane football seasons
Missouri Valley Conference football champion seasons
Tulsa Golden Hurricane football